Get Hard is a 2015 American crime comedy film directed by Etan Cohen (in his directorial debut) and written by Cohen, Jay Martel and Ian Roberts. The film stars Will Ferrell and Kevin Hart with Tip 'T.I.' Harris, Alison Brie and Craig T. Nelson in supporting roles. James King, a wealthy investment bank manager (Ferrell) is framed for a crime he didn't commit, and asks the man who washes his car, Darnell Lewis (Hart) to help him prepare for prison.

The film was released March 27, 2015 to generally unfavourable reviews. The film was a box office success, grossing a worldwide total of $111.7 million on a $40–44 million budget.

Plot
James King is an extremely wealthy hedge fund manager at Barrow Funds, engaged to Alissa, the daughter of his boss Martin Barrow. During an engagement party for James and Alissa, the FBI arrive and arrest James for fraud and embezzlement. James' lawyer, Peter Penny urges him to plead guilty for a likely shorter sentence, but James refuses under the belief that he will be exonerated. James is found guilty and subsequently sentenced to ten years in San Quentin State Prison, with the judge allowing him 30 days to get his affairs in order. On top of this, Alissa leaves James after he suggests the two flee the country together.

Over time, James has come to know Darnell Lewis, who operates a small car wash business in the parking lot used by James. Shortly after his arrest, James encounters Darnell and, assuming he has been incarcerated before because he is black, begs him for help, requesting to be "toughened up". Darnell, who in actuality has never been to prison and has little experience in fighting, agrees, on the condition James pays him $30,000; Darnell sees it as an opportunity for him and his wife Rita to finally put their daughter Makayla in a better school, away from the bad neighborhood they live in.

Darnell's training, which includes pepper-spraying James, re-modelling his house to resemble a maximum security prison and creating multiple scenarios in which he must defend himself, all fail miserably. During the training, James gets in touch with Martin to tell him about his search for help. Martin, the actual crook, believes James is onto him and orders a hitman named Gayle to monitor him.

With James' training seemingly going nowhere, Darnell suggests that James should prepare in other ways for prison, and takes him to a gay hookup spot to teach James how to perform oral sex in prison. James can't go through with it and instead tells Darnell that he will keep going and do whatever it takes in order to "get hard". James soon after begins to work out harder and faster, makes shivs, learns "keistering" (smuggling contraband in the anus), and seems to be making progress. Darnell simulates a prison riot with help from James' domestic staff. In the chaos, James gets a shiv stuck in his head, after which, Darnell brings James to his home for Rita to treat it. James has dinner with Darnell's family and listens to the tale of how he ended up in prison, which is actually just a retelling of the movie Boyz n the Hood.

James and Darnell resolve for James to join a local gang called the Crenshaw Kings to gain protection in prison. However, Darnell's cousin and gang leader Russell rebuffs James and redirects him to the Alliance of Whites gang. James is unable to portray a convincing racist, leading the gang to think he is a cop; they threaten to attack James, but Darnell rescues him by bursting in with a flamethrower.

Eventually, Darnell and James finally deduce that Martin is the crook, and the reason James is going to prison. They sneak into his office and find the embezzlement records on Martin's computer. Before they can expose him, Gayle finds them and takes back the computer, informing James that Darnell is not who he thinks is and has never been in prison. Dejected and upset that Darnell lied to him, James returns to the Crenshaw Kings on his own, asking to join. They accept him as one of their own and order him to kill someone as his initiation. Before he can do so, Darnell arrives in time to convince James to expose Martin.

The two sneak onto Martin's yacht to retrieve the computer, only to come across Gayle and his men. James unleashes a series of capoeira moves on them before Martin and Alissa arrive, both confessing to the fraud and embezzlement, a scheme that also included Peter. They try to convince James to run away with them, but he turns them down and heads to a life raft with Darnell. When Gayle shoots the life raft, James pulls out a gun he had "keistered" and aims it at Gayle. U.S. Marshals suddenly appear, summoned by the ankle monitor that James triggered, having trespassed the county line.

Barrow's computer provides the evidence needed to clear James. Martin, Gayle, Alissa, and the henchmen are all arrested and James is exonerated. However, he still ends up getting six months for holding an unlicensed gun, but thanks to Darnell's training, James is fully prepared for his stint in prison. Martin is not, as he is quickly attacked by inmates when his San Quentin sentence with Peter begins. James spends his sentence helping the FBI retrieve all the assets that Martin stole, while guiding Darnell's investments so that he and Rita are able to open their own carwash. As Darnell drives James home after his release, James announces his intent to celebrate his freedom with a Wall Street Journal and a forty, which he now considers a perfect Sunday.

Cast
 Will Ferrell as James King, a hedge fund manager who is framed for embezzlement
 Kevin Hart as Darnell Lewis, a car wash attendant who helps James prepare for prison, despite never being in prison.
 Craig T. Nelson as Martin Barrow, the head of Barrow Funds and father of Alissa who frames James for embezzlement
 Alison Brie as Alissa Barrow, the gold-digging fiancée of James and daughter of Martin Barrow
 Edwina Findley as Rita Lewis, Darnell's wife
 Tip 'T.I.' Harris as Russell, Darnell's cousin who is the leader of the Crenshaw Kings
 Ariana Neal as Makayla Lewis, Darnell and Rita's daughter
 Erick Chavarria as Cecelio, James' gardener
 Katia Gomez as Rosa, James' maid
 Greg Germann as Peter Penny, a lawyer associated with James and Martin
 Paul Ben-Victor as Gayle, Martin's hired help
 John Mayer as himself, he performs at James and Alissa's engagement party and later appears on The Tonight Show Starring Jimmy Fallon where he talks about James and sings a sample from his ballad about him
 Jon Eyez as Big Mike
 Nito Larioza as Jaoa
 Dan Bakkedahl as Leo
 Ron Funches as Jojo, a member of the Crenshaw Kings
 Elliot Grey as Judge V. Carlyle, the judge that presides over James' trial
 Matt Walsh as Bathroom Stall Man
 T. J. Jagodowski as Chris
 Dominique Perry as Shonda
 Jimmy Fallon as himself (uncredited), he interviews John Mayer about being present during James' arrest

Production
On December 7, 2012, it was announced that Warner Bros. was in talks to acquire the film written by Ian Roberts and Jay Martel, while Adam McKay and Will Ferrell's Gary Sanchez Productions would produce. On September 17, 2013 Etan Cohen was set to direct. On February 24, 2014, Warner Bros. set the film for a March 27, 2015 release.

On December 7, 2012, Will Ferrell and Kevin Hart were attached to starring roles. On February 26, 2014, it was announced Craig T. Nelson had joined the cast to play Martin Barrow, the founder of Barrow Funds (Ferrell's character's boss) and also the father of Ferrell's character's fiancée. On March 17, 2014 Alison Brie signed on to star, playing the fiancée of Ferrell's character. On March 21, 2014, Edwina Findley joined the cast to play Rita Hudson, wife to Hart's character. On March 24, 2014 Dan Bakkedahl joined the cast to play Rick, Ferrell's hated enemy at their office. On March 25, 2014, T.I. joined the cast, playing a character named Russell, Hart's character's streetwise cousin.

Principal photography began on March 17, 2014 in New Orleans, and ended on May 14, 2014. The film was somewhat controversial with some perceiving that it was playing into race-related stereotypes. During some scenes Cohen asked Hart's opinion on how some jokes would be perceived by African American audiences and made some changes accordingly. Warner Bros. and Cohen also performed extensive testing to make sure the humor came across well.

Music
On October 30, 2014, Christophe Beck was hired to compose the music for the film.

Release
The film was released by Warner Bros. on March 27, 2015.

Box office
Get Hard grossed $90.4 million in the U.S. and Canada, and $21.3 million in other territories for a worldwide total of $111.7 million against a budget of $40 million. (Other reports put the budget at $44 million. The film also received $12.3 million in tax incentives for filming in Louisiana.)

In its opening weekend, the film grossed $33.8 million, coming in second place at the box office behind Home ($52.1 million). It was Ferrell's third-highest opening for a live-action film, behind Talladega Nights: The Ballad of Ricky Bobby ($47 million) and The Other Guys ($35.5 million), and was passed the following December by Daddy's Home ($38.7 million).

Critical response
Get Hard has received generally negative reviews, with many critics citing the film's overuse of racial jokes. On Rotten Tomatoes, the film has an approval rating of 28% based on 186 reviews, with an average rating of 4.40/10. The site's critical consensus reads, "A waste of two fine funnymen, Get Hard settles for tired and offensive gags instead of tapping into its premise's boundary-pushing potential." On Metacritic the film has a weighted average score of 34 out of 100, based on reviews from 43 critics, indicating "generally unfavorable reviews". CinemaScore polls conducted during the opening weekend recorded that audiences gave Get Hard an average grade of "B" on an A+ to F scale.

Richard Corliss of Time magazine wrote: "Laughter trumps political fairness, and Get Hard made me laugh at, and with, situations I hadn’t thought could tickle me. The movie has a warm heart beating under its seemingly scabrous shell."

The film was criticized for its gay panic jokes and homophobia.

References

External links
 
 

2015 films
2010s buddy comedy films
2010s crime comedy films

American buddy comedy films

American crime comedy films
American LGBT-related films
American prison comedy films
African-American films
Dune Entertainment films
Films about racism in the United States
Films directed by Etan Cohen
Films produced by Will Ferrell
Films scored by Christophe Beck
Films set in prison
Films shot in New Orleans
Gary Sanchez Productions films
Films with screenplays by Adam McKay
Films with screenplays by Etan Cohen
Warner Bros. films
2015 directorial debut films
Hood comedy films
2015 comedy films
2010s English-language films
2010s American films